The canton of Frontignan is an administrative division of the Hérault department, southern France.

Municipalities 
This Canton was revised in 2008, and again in 2015.
Since the French canton reorganisation which came into effect in March 2015, the communes of the canton of Frontignan are:
 Balaruc-les-Bains
 Balaruc-le-Vieux
 Frontignan
 Gigean
 Mireval
 Vic-la-Gardiole

Councillors

Pictures of the canton

References

External links 
Site of INSEE

Frontignan